This is a list of former and current Eintracht Frankfurt players.
Note:Career dates include first team years only.

Appearances and goals also include league, national cup and European matches and goals.

Current players are in bold typeface.

This is a list of notable footballers who have played for Eintracht Frankfurt from the formation of the club in 1899 to present. It generally includes only players who made more than 100 league appearances for the club, but some players with fewer than 100 appearances are also included. This includes players who have set a club record, such as most appearances, most goals, biggest transfer fee, honorary captains or honorary club members.

Notable players

Bold type indicates that the player currently plays for the club.

International players

This is a list of Eintracht Frankfurt players who have been capped at full international level by their country whilst at the club.

Jürgen Grabowski played the most caps while an Eintracht player, with 44 for West Germany.

Makoto Hasebe played the most caps, with 114 for Japan.



List of Eintracht Frankfurt international players

Afghanistan 

Abassin Alikhil
Ali Amiri
Zubayr Amiri
Milad Salem

Albania 

Geri Cipi
Mehmet Dragusha
Ervin Skela

Algeria

Karim Matmour

Australia

Ajdin Hrustic
Dave Mitchell
Ned Zelic

Austria 

Martin Hinteregger
Erwin Hoffer
Stefan Ilsanker
Ümit Korkmaz
Stefan Lexa
Heinz Lindner
Thomas Parits
Bruno Pezzey
Markus Weissenberger
Gerd Wimmer

Azerbaijan 

Renat Dadashov

Bosnia and Herzegovina 

Zlatan Bajramović
Marijan Ćavar

Cameroon

Serge Branco
Mohammadou Idrissou

Canada 

Olivier Occéan

China

Yang Chen

Colombia

Rafael Santos Borré

Republic of the Congo 

Rolf-Christel Guié-Mien

Croatia 

Kristijan Jakić
Ivica Mornar
Ante Rebić
Gordon Schildenfeld

Czech Republic 

Martin Fenin
Václav Kadlec
Karel Rada

Denmark 

Jesper Lindstrøm
Frederik Rønnow

Finland 

Lukáš Hrádecký

France

Randal Kolo Muani

Georgia 

Kakhaber Tskhadadze

Germany 

Note: 1908-1945 German Empire, 1945-1990 West Germany and since 1990 reunified Germany

Erich Bäumler
Fritz Becker
Uwe Bein  
Thomas Berthold  
Manfred Binz
Ronny Borchers  
Ralf Falkenmayer  
Maurizio Gaudino  
Mario Götze  
Jürgen Grabowski  
Rudolf Gramlich  
Horst Heldt  
Bernd Hölzenbein  
Sebastian Jung  
Andreas Köpke  
Charly Körbel  
Richard Kress  
Thomas Kroth  
Willi Lindner  
Friedel Lutz  
Hugo Mantel  
Andreas Möller  
Alfons Moog
Bernd Nickel  
Alfred Pfaff  
Peter Reichel  
Franz Schütz  
Wolfgang Solz  
Hans Stubb  
Willi Tiefel  
Kevin Trapp
Ralf Weber  
Hans Weilbächer
Amin Younes

Ghana 

Anthony Yeboah

Greece 

Ioannis Amanatidis
Theofanis Gekas
Sotirios Kyrgiakos
Nikos Liberopoulos
Georgios Tzavelas

Hungary 

Lajos Détári

Iran 

Mehdi Mahdavikia

Israel 

Taleb Tawatha

Ivory Coast 

Constant Djakpa

Jamaica

Michael Hector

Japan 

Makoto Hasebe
Junichi Inamoto
Takashi Inui
Daichi Kamada
Naohiro Takahara

Luxembourg 

Jan Ostrowski

Mexico 

Marco Fabián
Aarón Galindo
Carlos Salcedo

Morocco 

Aymen Barkok

North Macedonia

Note: 1993-2019 Former Yugoslav Republic of Macedonia (FYROM) and since 2019 North Macedonia. 
Saša Ćirić
Oka Nikolov
Aleksandar Vasoski

Norway 

Jørn Andersen
Vadim Demidov
Jens Petter Hauge

Nigeria 

Jay-Jay Okocha

Paraguay 

Nelson Valdez

Peru 

Carlos Zambrano

Philippines

Stephan Schröck

Poland 

Dariusz Adamczuk
Paweł Kryszałowicz
Włodzimierz Smolarek

Portugal 

Gonçalo Paciência
André Silva

Serbia 

Mijat Gaćinović
Luka Jović
Filip Kostić

Slovakia 

Marek Penksa

South Korea 

Cha Bum-Kun
Cha Du-Ri

Sweden 

Jan Svensson

Switzerland 

Tranquillo Barnetta
Walter Dietrich
Gelson Fernandes
Benjamin Huggel
Pirmin Schwegler
Haris Seferovic
Djibril Sow
Christoph Spycher
Steven Zuber

Turkey 

Halil Altıntop
Ender Konca

United States 

Paxten Aaronson
Ricardo Clark
Timothy Chandler

FR Yugoslavia 

Slobodan Komljenović

Medalist players at major international tournaments

World Cup

Champions
World Cup 1954 – West Germany
  Alfred Pfaff (1949–1961)
  Toni Turek (1946–1947)

World Cup 1974 – West Germany
  Jürgen Grabowski (1965–1980)
  Bernd Hölzenbein (1967–1981)

World Cup 1990 – West Germany
  Uwe Bein (1989–1994)
  Thomas Berthold (1982–1987)
  Andreas Köpke (1994–1996)
  Andreas Möller (1985–1987), (1990–1992), (2003–2004)

World Cup 2014 – Germany
  Joachim Löw (1981–1982)
  Erik Durm (2019–2022)

Runner-up
World Cup 1954 – Hungary
  Gyula Lóránt (1976, as a manager)

World Cup 1966 – West Germany
  Friedel Lutz (1957–1966), (1967–1973)
  Jürgen Grabowski (1965–1980)
  Hans Tilkowski (1967–1970)

World Cup 1982 – West Germany
  Manfred Kaltz (2000–2001, as an assistant manager)
  Felix Magath (1999–2001, as a manager)

World Cup 1986 – West Germany
  Thomas Berthold (1982–1987)
  Felix Magath (1999–2001, as a manager)
  Uwe Rahn (1992–1993)
  Wolfgang Rolff (2014–2015, as an assistant manager)
  Uli Stein (1987–1994)

World Cup 2002 – Germany
  Jörg Böhme (1995–1996)
  Marko Rehmer (2005–2007)
  Bernd Schneider (1998–1999)

World Cup 2018 – Croatia
  Ante Rebić (2016–2019)

World Cup 2022 – France
  Randal Kolo Muani (2022–)

Third place
World Cup 1934 – Germany
  Rudi Gramlich (1929–1939), (1943–1944)

World Cup 1970 – West Germany
  Jürgen Grabowski (1965–1980)

World Cup 1982 – Poland
  Włodzimierz Smolarek (1986–1988)

World Cup 2006 – Germany
  Timo Hildebrand (2014–2015)
  Bernd Schneider (1998–1999)

World Cup 2010 – Germany
  Joachim Löw (1981–1982)
  Marko Marin (1996–2005)

World Cup 2014 – Netherlands
  Jonathan de Guzmán (2017–2020)

World Cup 2022 – Croatia
  Kristijan Jakić (2021–)

Continental tournaments

UEFA Euro/European Nations' Cup

Champions
UEFA Euro 1972 – West Germany
  Jürgen Grabowski (1965–1980)
  Jupp Heynckes (1994–1995, as a manager)
  Horst Köppel (1994–1995, as an assistant manager)

UEFA Euro 1980 – West Germany
  Felix Magath (1999–2001, as a manager)

UEFA Euro 1996 – Germany
  Andreas Köpke (1994–1996)
  Andreas Möller (1985–1987), (1990–1992), (2003–2004)

Runners-up
European Nations' Cup 1960 – Yugoslavia
  Fahrudin Jusufi (1966–1970)
  Branko Zebec (1982–1983, as a manager)

UEFA Euro 1976 – West Germany
  Bernd Hölzenbein (1967–1981)
  Peter Reichel (1970–1979)

UEFA Euro 1992 – Germany
  Manfred Binz (1985–1996)
  Thomas Doll (1994–1996)
  Andreas Köpke (1994–1996)
  Andreas Möller (1985–1987), (1990–1992), (2003–2004)

UEFA Euro 1996 – Czech Republic
  Karel Rada (2001–2002)

Africa Cup of Nations

Champions
1994 African Cup of Nations – Nigeria
  Jay-Jay Okocha (1992–1996)

Runners-up
1992 African Cup of Nations – Ghana
  Tony Yeboah (1990–1995)

Copa América

Third place
2021 Copa América – Colombia
  Rafael Santos Borré (2021–)

Summer Olympics

Gold
Summer Olympics 1952 – Hungary
  Gyula Lóránt (1976, as a manager)

Summer Olympics 1960– Yugoslavia
  Fahrudin Jusufi (1966–1970)

Summer Olympics 1996 – Nigeria
  Jay-Jay Okocha (1992–1996)

Summer Olympics 2000 – Cameroon
  Serge Branco (2000–2003)

Summer Olympics 2012 – Mexico

  Marco Fabián (2016–2019)

Silver
Summer Olympics 1924 – Switzerland
  Walter Dietrich (1925–1938)

Summer Olympics 1952 – Yugoslavia
  Ivica Horvat (1957–1961)
  Branko Zebec (1982–1983, as a manager)

Summer Olympics 1992 – Poland
  Dariusz Adamczuk (1992–1993)

Summer Olympics 2016 – Germany
  Niklas Süle (2006–2009)

Bronze
Summer Olympics 1988 – West Germany
  Ralf Sievers (1982–1990)
  Rudolf Bommer (1992–1997)
  Olaf Janßen (1996–2000)

References

External links
Eintracht Frankfurt Archive 

List of Eintracht Frankfurt Players
Lists of association football players by club in Germany
 
Association football player non-biographical articles